The Kashmir white-toothed shrew (Crocidura pullata) is a species of mammal in the family Soricidae. It is found in India and Pakistan.

References

Crocidura
Mammals described in 1911
Taxonomy articles created by Polbot